Arroyo is an unincorporated community in Hancock County, West Virginia, United States. It was also known as Brooklyn.

The community derives name from nearby Dry Creek, arroyo meaning "dry creek" in Spanish.

References 

Unincorporated communities in West Virginia
Unincorporated communities in Hancock County, West Virginia